Bales is the surname of:

 Alison Bales (born 1985), American basketball player
 Barry Bales (born 1969), American musician
 Billy Bales (born 1929), British former motorcycle speedway racer
 Burt Bales (1917–1989), American jazz pianist
 Christopher Bales (c. 1564–1590), English Catholic priest and martyr
 Dalton Bales (1920–1979), Canadian politician and lawyer
 Gerald Bales (1919–2002), Canadian organist and composer
 James D. Bales (1915–1995), American bible professor
 Kevin Bales, American author and slavery expert
 Lee Bales (born 1944), American former basketball player
 Mike Bales (born 1971), Canadian former ice hockey player
 Peter Bales (1547–c. 1610), English calligraphist
 Robert Bales (born 1973), American soldier who murdered 16 Afghan civilians
 Robert F. Bales (1916–2004), American social psychologist
 Steve Bales, NASA engineer and flight controller
 Thomas Bales, drummer for the country rock band Flynnville Train

See also 
 Jerry Bails (1933–2006), American popular culturist and champion of comic books
 Bailes, another surname
 Bayles (name), another surname